Aravu is a village in Räpina Parish, Põlva County in eastern Estonia.

Writer and psychiatrist Vaino Vahing (1940–2008) was born in Aravu.

References

 

Villages in Põlva County